Erik Randall Davis (born October 8, 1986) is an American former professional baseball pitcher. He played one year in Major League Baseball (MLB) with the Washington Nationals in 2013.

Career

Amateur
Davis attended Mountain View High School in Mountain View, California, and Stanford University. In 2006 and 2007, he played collegiate summer baseball with the Brewster Whitecaps of the Cape Cod Baseball League.

San Diego Padres
The San Diego Padres selected Davis in the 13th round of the 2008 Major League Baseball draft.

Washington Nationals
Before the 2011 season, the Padres traded Davis to the Washington Nationals for Alberto González. Davis started the 2013 season with the Triple-A Syracuse Chiefs. The Nationals promoted him to the major leagues for the first time on June 2, 2013. He was optioned back to Syracuse on June 13, and recalled on June 29. Davis was optioned back to Syracuse on July 1 when Bryce Harper was activated from the disabled list. He was recalled again when rosters expanded on September 1.

Davis was placed on the 60-day disabled list with an elbow strain on February 13, 2014. He would miss the remainder of the season. In 2015, Davis split time between Double-A and Triple-A.

Arizona Diamondbacks
On November 17, 2016, Davis signed a minor league contract with the Arizona Diamondbacks.

Milwaukee Brewers
He elected free agency on November 6, 2017, and signed a minor league contract with the Milwaukee Brewers on December 18. He became a free agent after the 2018 season.

Repertoire
Davis's pitch repertoire consists of a four-seam fastball (94 mph), curveball (78 mph), and changeup (85 mph).

References

External links

1986 births
Living people
Baseball players from San Jose, California
Major League Baseball pitchers
Washington Nationals players
Stanford Cardinal baseball players
Brewster Whitecaps players
Eugene Emeralds players
Fort Wayne TinCaps players
Lake Elsinore Storm players
Portland Beavers players
San Antonio Missions players
Harrisburg Senators players
Potomac Nationals players
Syracuse Chiefs players
Peoria Saguaros players
Gigantes del Cibao players
American expatriate baseball players in the Dominican Republic
Reno Aces players
Mountain View High School alumni
Colorado Springs Sky Sox players